Fowl Cay Airport  is a public use airport located near Fowl Cay, the Bahamas.

See also
List of airports in the Bahamas

References

External links 
 Airport record for Fowl Cay Airport at Landings.com

Airports in the Bahamas